The Gemini Lounge is an upcoming American independent crime thriller film directed by Danny A. Abeckaser, written by Kosta Kondilopoulos, and starring Abeckaser, Emile Hirsch, Lucy Hale, Ashley Greene and Greg Finley.

Cast
Emile Hirsch as Bobby Belucci
Greg Finley as Anthony Senter
Lucy Hale as Gina
Ashley Greene
Danny A. Abeckaser as Roy DeMeo
Vincent Laresca
Jake Cannavale
Robert Davi
Bo Dietl
Sid Rosenberg
Jeremy Luke
James Russo

Production
In March 2022, it was announced that Emile Hirsch, Lucy Hale, Ashley Greene and Greg Finley would star in the film.  Principal photography began in March 2022 Los Angeles and New York.

Release
In February 2023, Vertical Entertainment purchased the North American rights to The Gemini Lounge.

References

External links

Upcoming films
Films shot in Los Angeles
Films shot in New York (state)
American crime thriller films
American crime drama films
Vertical Entertainment films